Vesty may refer to:

Sam Vesty, an English rugby player
Vesti (TV channel), a TV station in Russia
Vesti (Israeli newspaper), a newspaper in Israel